Kundadam block is a revenue block in Dharapuram taluk of the Tiruppur district of Tamil Nadu, India. It has a total of 24 panchayat villages.

Village Panchayats in Kundadam Block 

 Aratholuvu
 Bellampatti
 Ellappalayampudur
 Gethelrev
 Jothiyampatti
 Kannankovil
 Kokkampalayam
 Kolumanguli
 Kurukkapalayam
 Maruthur
 Molarapatti
 Muthiyampatti
 Nandavanampalayam
 Navanari
 Periakumarapalayam
 Perumalpalayam
 Punganthurai
 Sadayapalayam
 Sankarandampalayam
 Sengodampalayam
 Sirukinar
 Suriyanallur
 Vadachinnaripalayam
 Velayuthampalayam

References 

 

Revenue blocks of Tiruppur district